Wei Shen Lim is a consultant respiratory physician and honorary professor of medicine at Nottingham University Hospitals NHS Trust, England.

Lim graduated from University of Nottingham Medical School in 1991 and has been on the specialist register for General Internal Medicine and Respiratory Medicine since 2002. Since November 2020 or earlier, he has been chairman of the COVID-19 subcommittee of the Joint Committee on Vaccination and Immunisation which provides advice to the UK government. 

In 2021 and in 2022, he received more than £25,001 in research funding from vaccine-maker Pfizer.

References 

Living people
Year of birth missing (living people)
20th-century British medical doctors
21st-century British medical doctors